Niklas Hoffmann (born 9 April 1997) is a German professional footballer who plays as a defensive midfielder for 2. Liga club SV Horn.

Career
Born in Landau, Rhineland-Palatinate, Hoffmann began playing football at TSV Fortuna Billigheim-Ingenheim in Südliche Weinstraße. At age 10, he joined the youth academy of Karlsruher SC after impressing at a youth tournament.

Hoffmann played with the youth teams of Karlsruhe in the Under 17 and Under 19 Bundesliga, as he led the U19s as team captain during his final season in that age group. During this time, he had already been selected for the first-team squad five times and once for the second team. In June 2016, he signed a three-year professional contract.

Failing to break through to the first team, Hoffmann moved to SC Freiburg in the summer of 2017, where he competed in the second team in the Regionalliga Südwest. Hoffmann ended the 2017–18 season in fourth place in the league with Freiburg II.

In the winter break of the following season, Hoffmann was signed by FC St. Pauli. As part of their second team, he successfully avoided relegation from the Regionalliga Nord. After the defender was able to make his debut for the first team in a first round win in the DFB-Pokal over VfB Lübeck in June 2019, head coach Jos Luhukay utilised him increasingly in the 2. Bundesliga due to injuries to regular starters.

After five 2. Bundesliga and 15 Regionalliga appearances for the Kiezkicker, Hoffmann moved to 3. Liga side Würzburger Kickers in late January 2020. There, he received a contract valid until 30 June 2021, with an option for an additional year.

Following Würzburger Kickers' relegation to the Regionalliga Bayern in the 2022–23 season, Hoffmann joined Austrian Second League club SV Horn on 2 July 2022.

Honours
Würzburger Kickers
3. Liga runners-up: 2019–20

References

External links
 
 

1997 births
Living people
People from Landau
Footballers from Rhineland-Palatinate
German footballers
German expatriate footballers
Association football central defenders
2. Bundesliga players
Regionalliga players
2. Liga (Austria) players
Karlsruher SC II players
Karlsruher SC players
SC Freiburg II players
FC St. Pauli II players
FC St. Pauli players
Würzburger Kickers players
SV Horn players
Expatriate footballers in Austria
German expatriate sportspeople in Austria